Pom Pom (神勇雙響炮; lit. "Supernaturally brave artillery") is a 1984 Hong Kong action comedy film directed by Joe Cheung. It is the first in a series of four Pom Pom films starring Richard Ng and John Shum.

The title of the film is the onomatopoeic representation of a gunshot sound. The title is sometimes suffixed with an exclamation mark as Pom Pom! and the alternate Hong Kong English title for the film is Boom Boom!

The film is something of a spinoff of Sammo Hung's Lucky Stars films, and Hung produced Pom Pom and released the film through his Bo Ho Films production company. Ng and Shum had been two of the original quintet of Lucky Stars in the film Winners and Sinners and their co-stars in that film, Hung, Charlie Chin and Stanley Fung make cameo appearances in Pom Pom as their characters from My Lucky Stars, released in the following year.

Jackie Chan and Yuen Biao, who had appeared in the original Lucky Stars trilogy also made cameo appearances as a motorcycle cop and truck driver respectively. The film also features appearances from several of their Hong Kong action film contemporaries, including Deanie Yip, Lam Ching Ying, Philip Chan, Dick Wei and Wu Ma.

Plot
Ah Chau (Richard Ng) and Beethoven (John Shum) are a pair of cops investigating a drug lord, but their ineptitude threatens to derail the case.
The police are well aware that Mr Sha (Chan Lung) is the boss of the crime syndicate smuggling and trafficking in drugs, and that he keeps details of his criminal transactions in a book which is kept by his mistress. When Beethoven and Ah Chau investigate, they find Sha's mistress dead, and inadvertently compromise all fingerprint evidence in the hideout. Luckily, they are assisted by beautiful cop Inspector Anna (Deannie Yip), who is secretly attracted to Ah Chau. Finally the two make their arrests and become instant heroes.

Cast and roles
 Richard Ng - Ah Chau (sometimes listed Achioo) as / Walker / Ng Ah Chiu
 John Shum - Beethoven / Johnny
 Deannie Yip - Anna
 Philip Chan - Inspector C.K. Chan
 Tai Po - Pimp Chou Wen
 Chung Fat - Columbo
 James Tien - Chief Inspector Tien
 Peter Chan - Mr. Sha
 Wu Ma - Police Station Employee / Painter
 Dennis Chan - Police Station Employee / Painter
 Kan Ng Min - Keung
 Kit Lee Chi - Pui
 Dick Wei - Scarman
 Yuen Biao - Garbage Truck Driver
 Sammo Hung - Eric / Kidstuff / Chi Koo Choi (Cameo appearance)
 Stanley Fung - Rawhide (Cameo appearance)
 Charlie Chin - Herb (Cameo appearance)
 Mars - Motorcycle Cop #1
 Jackie Chan - Motorcycle Cop #2 / Skater
 Lam Ching-ying - Police Sergeant
 Lau Chau Sang - Mr. Sha's Thug
 Johnny Cheung - Mr. Sha's Thug
 Steve Mak - Mr. Sha's Thug
 Chin Kar-lok - Mr. Sha's Thug
 Pang Yun-Cheung - Mr. Sha's Thug
 Wellson Chin - Police Station Employee
 Chin Yuet Sang - Passenger in stalled car
 Chong Man Ching - Driver of stalled car
 Fung Ging Man - Mahjong player
 Tai San - Bill

Sequels
Pom Pom was followed by 3 sequels:
 The Return of Pom Pom (雙龍出海) (1984)
 Mr. Boo Meets Pom Pom (智勇三寶) (1985)
 Pom Pom Strikes Back (雙龍吐珠) (1986)

References

External links
 
 
 Pom Pom at HKCinemagic

1984 films
1980s action comedy films
Hong Kong martial arts comedy films
1984 comedy films
1980s Hong Kong films